Ian John Ciantar (born 19 December 1975 in St. Julian's, Malta) is a professional footballer who most recently played for Maltese Premier League side Sliema Wanderers, where he played as a defender.

Personal life
 Ian is the older brother of Floriana defender Clifton Ciantar.

External links
 

Living people
1975 births
Maltese footballers
Sliema Wanderers F.C. players
Floriana F.C. players
Malta international footballers
Association football defenders